{{DISPLAYTITLE:C24H33N3O2}}
The molecular formula C24H33N3O2 (molar mass: 395.538 g/mol, exact mass: 395.2573 u) may refer to:

 LY-215,840
 WAY-100135

Molecular formulas